Marcus Johnson (born August 5, 1994) is an American football wide receiver for the New York Giants of the National Football League (NFL). After playing college football for Texas, he was signed by the Philadelphia Eagles as an undrafted free agent following the 2016 NFL Draft. He also previously played for the Tennessee Titans and Indianapolis Colts.

Early years
Johnson attended and played high school football at Clear Springs High School.

College career
Johnson attended and played college football at the University of Texas. He started in 18 of 42 total games played during his time at UT. During Spring 2014, Johnson was a member of the Big 12 Commissioner's Honor Roll. While at UT, Johnson was a physical culture and sports major with a career interest in either physical therapy or sports medicine.

Collegiate statistics

Professional career

Philadelphia Eagles
Johnson signed with the Philadelphia Eagles as an undrafted free agent on May 5, 2016. He suffered a quadriceps injury early in training camp that caused him to miss most of the practices. He was waived during final roster cuts on September 3, 2016, but was re-signed to the team's practice squad the next day. He was released by the Eagles on September 13, but was later re-signed back to their practice squad on December 2. He signed a reserve/future contract with the Eagles on January 2, 2017.

After impressing coaches during training camp in 2017, Johnson made the 53-man roster on September 2, 2017. In Week 5, against the Arizona Cardinals, he recorded his first career catch, a six-yard reception. Johnson was a member of the Eagles Super Bowl LII Championship team after defeating the New England Patriots 41–33.

Seattle Seahawks
On March 7, 2018, Johnson and a 2018 fifth-round draft pick were traded to the Seattle Seahawks in exchange for Michael Bennett and a seventh-round draft pick. The trade became official on March 14, 2018, at the start of the new league year.

Indianapolis Colts

On September 1, 2018, Johnson was traded to the Indianapolis Colts for tight end Darrell Daniels. In Week 6, against the New York Jets, he scored his first professional touchdown. He was placed on injured reserve on October 16, 2018, after suffering an ankle injury in Week 6.

Johnson was waived/injured during final roster cuts on August 31, 2019, and reverted to the team's injured reserve list the next day. He was waived from injured reserve with an injury settlement on September 9. On October 1, 2019, Johnson was re-signed to Colts' practice squad. He was promoted to the active roster on November 9.
In Week 14 against the Tampa Bay Buccaneers, Johnson caught three passes for 105 yards, including a 46-yard touchdown, in the 38–35 loss.

On April 22, 2020, Johnson was re-signed to a one-year contract. He was waived on September 5, 2020. On September 23, 2020, Johnson was signed to the practice squad. He was elevated to the active roster on October 3 and 10 for the team's weeks 4 and 5 games against the Chicago Bears and Cleveland Browns, and reverted to the practice squad following each game He was promoted to the active roster on October 17. In Week 6 against the Cincinnati Bengals, he recorded a career-high 108 receiving yards in the 31–27 victory. On January 2, 2021, Johnson was waived by the Colts.

Tennessee Titans 
On January 6, 2021, Johnson signed to the Tennessee Titans' practice squad. His practice squad contract with the team expired after the season on January 18, 2021. He re-signed with the Titans on March 9, 2021. He was placed on injured reserve on September 2, 2021. He was activated on October 9. He was placed injured reserve again on November 23, 2021.

San Francisco 49ers
On April 11, 2022, the San Francisco 49ers signed Johnson. He was released on August 30, 2022.

New York Giants
On September 6, 2022, Johnson was signed to the New York Giants practice squad. Johnson was elevated from the practice squad for Week 4 and Week 5 games against the Chicago Bears and Green Bay Packers. On October 15, 2022, he was elevated from the practice squad for the third time this season for Week 6 game against the Baltimore Ravens. He was promoted to the active roster on October 18.

NFL career statistics

Personal life
Johnson's father Morlon, played college basketball at Prairie View A&M. Johnson's hobbies include listening to music and playing video games.

References

External links
 Indianapolis Colts bio
 Texas Longhorns football bio

1994 births
Living people
American football wide receivers
Indianapolis Colts players
New York Giants players
People from League City, Texas
Philadelphia Eagles players
Players of American football from Texas
San Francisco 49ers players
Seattle Seahawks players
Sportspeople from Harris County, Texas
Tennessee Titans players
Texas Longhorns football players